Lake Viitina is a lake of Estonia, in Võru County. It is known for its dragnet fishing competitions.

See also
List of lakes of Estonia

Viitina
Rõuge Parish
Viitina